Berlin German, or Berlin dialect (or ; derogative:), is the regiolect spoken in the city of Berlin as well as its surrounding metropolitan area. It originates from a Brandenburgisch dialect. However, several phrases in Berlin German are typical of and unique to the city, indicating the manifold origins of immigrants, such as the Huguenots from France.

Overview
The area of Berlin was one of the first to abandon East Low German as a written language, which occurred in the 16th century, and later also as a spoken language. That was the first regiolect of Standard German with definite High German roots but a Low German substratum apparently formed (Berlinerisch may therefore be considered an early form of Missingsch). Only recently has the new dialect expanded into the surroundings, which had used East Low German.

Since the 20th century, the Berlin dialect has been a colloquial standard in the surrounding Brandenburg region. However, in Berlin proper, especially in the former West Berlin, the dialect is now seen more as a sociolect, largely through increased immigration and trends among the educated population to speak Standard German in everyday life.

Occasionally, the regiolect is found on advertising.

Phonology
Berliner pronunciation is similar to that of other High German varieties. Nevertheless, it maintains unique characteristics, which set it apart from other variants. The most notable are the strong contraction trends over several words and the rather irreverent adaptation of foreign words and anglicisms that are difficult to understand for many speakers of Upper German. Also, some words contain the letter j (representing IPA: [j]) instead of g, as is exemplified in the word for good, in which gut becomes jut.

Grammar
Berlinese grammar contains some notable differences from that of Standard German. For instance, the accusative case and dative case are not distinguished. Similarly, conjunctions that are distinguished in standard German are not in Berlinese. For example, in Standard German, wenn (when, if) is used for conditional, theoretical or consistent events, and wann (when) is used for events that are currently occurring or for questions. There is no difference between the two in Berlinese.

Genitive forms are also replaced by prepositional accusative forms, some still with an inserted pronoun: dem sein Haus (this one his house) rather than the standard sein Haus (his house). Plural forms often have an additional -s, regardless of the standard plural ending.

Words ending in -ken are often written colloquially and pronounced as -sken.

Pronouns
Personal pronoun:

Interrogative pronoun:

See also
 Missingsch

References

External links
 Berlinerisch-German dictionary

Culture in Berlin
Dialects by location
Central German languages
German dialects
Languages of Germany
City colloquials